Wally Masur and Tom Nijssen were the champions of the event when it last took place, in 1988. Neither of them participated in 1990.Emilio Sánchez and Slobodan Živojinović won the title, defeating Goran Ivanišević and Balázs Taróczy 7–5, 6–3, in the final.

Seeds

  Tim Pawsat /  Laurie Warder (first round)
  Mansour Bahrami /  Éric Winogradsky (quarterfinals)
  Goran Ivanišević /  Balázs Taróczy (final)
  Emilio Sánchez /  Slobodan Živojinović (champions)

Draw

Draw

References
General

Doubles